Odiong may refer to:
Edidiong Odiong, an athlete from Bahrain
Odiong, a barangay in Jagna, Bohol